The Borgarting was one of the major popular assemblies or things (lagting) of medieval Norway.  Historically, it was the site of the court and assembly for the southern coastal region of Norway from the south-eastern border with Sweden, westwards to the today's Risør in Aust-Agder.

Borgarting was named after its seat, the town of Borg (today Sarpsborg). It was established before 1164 when it absorbed the districts Grenland and Telemark. When Norway was united as a kingdom, the first lagtings were constituted as superior regional assemblies. The ancient regional assemblies – Frostating, Gulating, Eidsivating and Borgarting – were eventually joined into a single jurisdiction. King Magnus Lagabøte had the existing body of law put into writing (1263–1280). In 1274, Magnus promulgated the new national law (Magnus Lagabøtes landslov), a unified code of laws to apply for the Kingdom of Norway. This compilation of the codified Gulating laws (Gulatingsloven) applied throughout the realm extending to overseas possessions including the Faroe islands and Shetland.

See also

 Medieval Scandinavian law

References

Other sources
Andersen, Per Sveaas  (1977) Samlingen av Norge og kristningen av landet : 800–1130 (Oslo: Universitetsforlaget) 
Larson, Laurence Marcellus  (2011) The Earliest Norwegian Laws (The Lawbook Exchange, Ltd)

Related Reading
Munch P.A. (1846) Norges gamle Love indtil 1387 (Christiania: Chr. Gröndahl)

Legal history of Norway
Sarpsborg
Thing (assembly)